Prefixes